Value-based price (also value optimized pricing and charging what the market will bear) is a pricing strategy which sets prices primarily, but not exclusively, according to the perceived or estimated value of a product or service to the customer rather than according to the cost of the product or historical prices. Where it is successfully used, it will improve profitability through generating higher prices without impacting greatly on sales volumes.

The approach is most successful when products are sold based on emotions (fashion), in niche markets, in shortages (e.g. drinks at open air festival on a hot summer day) or for complementary products (e.g. printer cartridges, headsets for cell phones). Goods which are very intensely traded (e.g. oil and other commodities) are often sold using cost-plus pricing. Goods which are sold to highly sophisticated customers in large markets (e.g. automotive industry) have also in the past been sold using cost-plus pricing, but thanks to modern pricing software and pricing systems and the ability to capture and analyze market data, more and more markets are migrating towards market- or value-based pricing.

Value-based pricing in its literal sense implies basing pricing on the product benefits perceived by the customer instead of on the exact cost of developing the product. For example, a painting may be priced as much more than the price of canvas and paints: the price in fact depends a lot on who the painter is. Painting prices also reflect factors such as age, cultural significance, and, most importantly, how much benefit the buyer is deriving. Owning an original Dalí or Picasso painting elevates the self-esteem of the buyer and hence elevates the perceived benefits of ownership.

Value-based versus cost-based pricing

Price should be controlled within the value of the benefits that one business provides for its customer, while at the same time considering the price that their competitors' charge. Thus, prices are to be set according to the value that the business provides for its customer. To maximize the profitability of the products sold by the business, the business has to measure the benefit of the product that they provide to their customers, survey the criteria for the customers' buying decision (speed of delivery, convenience or reliability, etc.) and also identify the value of the benefits provided to the customer.

Cost-plus pricing
Cost-plus pricing is an approach which takes the total cost of producing the product or service and adding some amount to allow the business to make a profit. For example, in a retail store, if a merchant buys something for $5, and they sell it for $10 to a customer, this is called cost-based pricing. However, the willingness for the customer to pay is limited by the benefits they can receive: "Benefits are net benefits, where any cost that the customer firm incurs in obtaining the sought benefits, apart from purchase price, are included" (Anderson and Wynstra, 2010,31). Thus, the customer-perceived value is the difference between the net benefit they received and the price the customer paid, the supplier will not make any profit if the products are sold below the cost. Using cost-plus pricing must represent the right mathematical formula plus the desired margin to operationalize profit for a business. Furthermore, this strategy usually cannot be only used in this manner because it is common that firms will need to include an essence of competitor pricing information to succeed when using cost-pricing strategies in a competitive market.

This method can be utilized successfully by a business when the following circumstances exist:

 The firm is a monopoly or has a capable level of control over the pricing market.
 There is not an ease of access for customers to reach other sources of similar products or services.
 There is no set or standard price that exists in the surrounding market.
 There is a high and growing demand in the market for the product/service.
 Customer loyalty is not a priority.

If the above circumstances do exist a firm can profit very heavily off of cost-based pricing due to the high profit margin created. This can be considered more short term as many of the factors above can change such as customer purchasing power. Customer needs and expectations may shift once a competitor in the market displays a value-based price causing a firms customer base to change supplier.

Value-based pricing
Value-based pricing is defined based on the value that a product or service can deliver to a predefined segment of customers which are the main factor for setting prices (Hinterhuber, 2008, 42), as value-based pricing depends on the strength of benefits that a company can prove and offer to their customers. Thus, value is the most important driving force in every business decision as value focuses on the price the potential customers are willing to pay based on the benefit offered by the business. When implementing a value based price for a product/service, the price must display the products benefits to the customer so that customer attraction is high. The price set based on value pricing must also reflect onto the firms overall marketing goals.

A benefit is typically meant in regards to achieving specific business goals. If the offered product or service helps to achieve these goals, it is typically valued higher. The foundation of value-based pricing is therefore to understand the customers' goals and the values used to achieve these goals. To maintain success in a firm the value-based price must be constantly assessed by the firm to ensure all internal and external factors are taken into consideration when releasing a price of the product to the public.

For example, the cost for fixing a pipe at a customer's home for a plumber is $17.50 with the cost of travel, material cost and an hour's labour. However, the plumber may decide to charge a total of $50 to benefit from this business. Thus, the customer might not be happy about the overcharged price given by the plumber, at the same time there are possibility that the plumber will lose their customer, so it is important to measure the value of a product before setting the price too high. Hence understanding the target customer's purchasing power is what will allow for a loyal customer base. This is ultimately the goal of value-based pricing because it maintains a long term stance on customer satisfaction and therefore revenue to the firm.

On the other hand, if the company has a clear-defined benefit that gives you an advantage over the competitor, the company is able to charge according to the value that is offered to the customers. Thus, this is a very profitable approach as it can break off potential customers who are driven only by price and also attract new customers from competitors. For example, Starbucks raised prices to maximize profits from price insensitive customers who depend on their gourmet coffee while losing customers who wanted cheaper prices to McDonald's.

Comparison with cost-based pricing 
Several factors affect customer willingness to pay certain prices; for example, the difference of needs between countries, individual customers' needs and wants, and the usual customer facing different occasions (actual and present needs) - hence a plan to suit all time value-based pricing is impossible. An extreme focus on value might leave the customer feeling exploited, leading to negative affect towards the company. In the long term, prices based on value-based pricing are always higher or equal to the prices taken from cost-based pricing - if the prices were any lower, the customer might perceive the actual value to be lower than the cost of producing the good plus a profit margin. Companies will not be interested in producing and selling the product at that price in the long term. Despite being difficult in implementation of both pricing techniques on companies, there should be consideration of values on products and market positioning brought out to the customers in the early stage of product development. Even if the essence of the pricing strategy is based on cost calculations, once the factor of customer information a value based strategy is being used. Cost based pricing has downfalls due to the strategy ignoring many elements that value-based pricing does not such as: competition, customer needs, customer preferences, overall business environment and positioning of product.

Implementation

Resolving competing objectives 

The conceptualization of sales strategy (Panagopoulos and Avlonitis, 2010) is an essential for companies to sell in a more strategic way rather than operationally selling their products. However, the focus of B2B (business-to-business) pricing method has transformed into the concept of appreciating and raising the value of a product in a market, such as value creation and value capture (Aspara and Tikkanen, 2013). One of the reasons for some companies not applying value-based pricing is that they do not know their own advantages and capabilities. Next, the objectives of the company are not aligned. It is a typical conflict of objectives in companies is market share versus profitability, because in a business tradition, the higher your market share, the more profitable the company is. Hence, to implement value-based pricing into a company, the company has to understand its objective and the advantages that stand out among the competitors in the same field. Thus, this will provide a benefit of dominating the targeted market for the company, hence, sustaining the segmented customers that the company is targeting.

Understanding customer segmentation 
There are many ways of approaching value-based pricing. However, segmentation between companies decides and affects which market segment the company is attracting or aiming for. Generally driving segments, there are customers who just go for the lowest price product, or value buyers who are willing to pay more to purchase products that are worth the price. Thus, value–based pricing companies are aiming for types of segmentation like value buyers. In reality, each and every product in the market is sold at different prices, for more or less similar products. However, selling the same product at different prices is often illegal, because it is regarded as price discrimination or treated as unfair. For example, if customer A and customer B purchased the same item but charged at different prices, this is perceived as unfair. Hence, two of the strategies to go around the market and still to charge more from one segment than another are price fencing and versioning. Price fences are criteria which customers must meet if they are to qualify for a lower price e.g. fencing price buyers from convenience buyers by offering a lower price to shoppers who use coupons found in local newspapers. A convenience buyer only goes to a store and purchase the product they want to get in full price. However, price buyer wants a low price, so they would clip out the coupon they got from the newspaper and redeem the coupon in the department store for a discount. Thus, fencing and versioning are just the ways of how we can address different segments with the willingness to pay at different price point. By capturing the willingness to pay from price buyers with a low-end offering, and at the same also segmenting convenience buyer. Thus, companies are able to charge a much higher price in convenience buyer segment, so profit increases by serving different segments in different price points.

Using pricing as pain management
However, coupons cannot be given out blindly before understanding which customers are willing to pay more when buying in large quantities. Periodically, some marketers have eliminated their competitors by driving down cost or developing upsetting technologies (Paranikas, Whiteford, Tevelson and Belz, 2015). Thus, market has been segmented out to set up different levels of discounts. Although market has a list price but no one ever pays the full list price, in fact, price negotiation turns into discount negotiation. For instance, the biggest challenge faced by market nowadays is giving too many discounts without getting anything in return. This proven that pricing is often a pain management, where when customer ask for discount or to purchase a product in lower price, customers have to give something back in return to get lower price or discounts. Hence, every discount should have a pain associated with it, because if customers do not suffer from the pain for asking to get a discount, they will just ask for more discounts.

Understanding price negotiation and fear
Price management and price psychology are related to each other. Companies often transform from a sole entrepreneur into a large company with multibillion-dollar contracts at stake, subject to both price anxiety and on the other hand price confidence. For example, when the buyer knows that the seller will win a deal at any cost, the seller will get it at any cost, meaning that the price will go down. Thus, in another way, the moment when the seller fears a price negotiation and on the other side there is an experienced buyer, the price will go down. It is often said that fear is the most expensive feeling in a company. Additionally, it is often seen that companies, salespersons, entrepreneurs, or freelancers are anxious to lose a deal when customer just takes the price down. Pricing confidence is an essential organizational characteristic which allows teams to sell the product confidently and believe in the price-worthy value of the product (Liozu et al., 2011). Therefore, it is important that companies build up pricing confidence in a team, showing the team a better insight, creating more value from the product. Furthermore, this leads to price confidence that leads from the confidence a seller has in the product they are selling. However, when the seller is not confident about the price or product they are selling, help from others to access your product that has the value for the price is possible as well, and this leads to commodization. Commodization happens when the product a seller offer is as good or as bad as the competitor is offering. In these scenarios, the seller will find it difficult to sell the product at a higher price. Customers often use commodization to drive down the price of a product during a negotiation. Thus, it is valuable to the seller to convince the buyer that the product is not a commodity when you understand the value and that the price of the product is justified.

Addressing the mindset change
Value-based Pricing is as much about a change in mindset, as it is about the underlying mechanics of establishing a price and the sales skills needed to achieve the price in the market. The most important first step in Value-based pricing is to address the mindset change, so that the entire commercial organization starts to think about selling value instead of just selling a product.

Companies with most successful VBP initiatives invest the time upfront to build a unified view across their commercial functions on some fundamental questions like ‘What is Value?’ and ‘How do we quantify Value?’  Answers to such questions are very specific and unique to each B2B company depending on what it sells, where it sells, who it sells to and how does it sell. A proven approach  is for companies to conduct a cross-functional workshop that involves not just the Product and the Marketing teams but also the Sales and Customer Service teams to build a company specific view on Value-based Pricing. Once this common definition is established, companies can then go about quantifying value and establishing the value-based price

See also
Demand-based pricing
Dynamic pricing 
Premium pricing or Price premium 
Pricing
Pricing science
Pricing strategies
Relationship-based pricing
Time-based pricing
Value-based purchasing

References

Pricing